Biflustra is a genus of bryozoans belonging to the family Membraniporidae.

The genus has cosmopolitan distribution.

Species
Species:

Biflustra actaeon 
Biflustra adenticulata 
Biflustra ajantarensis 
Biflustra akshiensis 
Biflustra amata 
Biflustra antidenticulata 
Biflustra aquitanica 
Biflustra arborescens 
Biflustra bartschi 
Biflustra bifossata 
Biflustra bituberculata 
Biflustra cetrata 
Biflustra chainei 
Biflustra chakrudensis 
Biflustra clathrata 
Biflustra conjunctiva 
Biflustra delta 
Biflustra denticulata 
Biflustra eriophoroidea 
Biflustra falsitenuis 
Biflustra falunica 
Biflustra grandicella 
Biflustra holocenica 
Biflustra hugliensis 
Biflustra irregulata 
Biflustra kralicensis 
Biflustra lamellosa 
Biflustra lamellosa 
Biflustra limosa 
Biflustra limosoidea 
Biflustra lingdingensis 
Biflustra marcusi 
Biflustra mathuri 
Biflustra mitiensis 
Biflustra monilifera 
Biflustra nana 
Biflustra oblongula 
Biflustra okadai 
Biflustra osnabrugensis 
Biflustra papillata 
Biflustra paragrandicella 
Biflustra parasavartii 
Biflustra paulensis 
Biflustra perambulata 
Biflustra perfragilis 
Biflustra puelcha 
Biflustra pura 
Biflustra quadrata 
Biflustra quadrilatera 
Biflustra ramosa 
Biflustra rectangularia 
Biflustra regularis 
Biflustra regularis 
Biflustra regularis 
Biflustra rynchota 
Biflustra savartii 
Biflustra similis 
Biflustra sphinx 
Biflustra stammeri 
Biflustra tenuis 
Biflustra teres 
Biflustra texturata 
Biflustra tuberosa 
Biflustra typica 
Biflustra virgata

References

Cheilostomatida